"30 Days in the Hole" is a song by English rock band Humble Pie. Released in late 1972, it was composed by the band's guitarist/singer Steve Marriott for the group's fifth album Smokin' (1972). The song received minor airplay at the time but failed to chart. However, it gained a following on album oriented rock (AOR) and classic rock radio formats and consequently it remains one of Humble Pie's best known songs.

The B-side on its US release was "Sweet Peace and Time", while everywhere else the B-side featured "C'mon Everybody" and "Road Runner".

The song, a Steve Marriott composition, bemoans being arrested for possession of small quantities of illegal drugs, including cocaine; Durban poison, a potent strain of marijuana; and Red Lebanese and Black Nepalese, two types of hashish. "New Castle Brown" is often mistaken as a reference to Newcastle Brown Ale but actually refers to heroin also known as "Brown" or "Smack".

Pie guitarist Clem Clempson has said it is one of the tracks he would most like his career to be remembered by. But the predominant group personality shown through by the song is Marriott's; so much so that when years later Clempson was asked about efforts to reform the group without Marriott, he simply declaimed, "It's a waste of time."

Live versions 
Marriott regularly played the song in the 1980s with his band Packet Of Three (with Jim Leverton and Jerry Shirley). The song was included in a 1984 concert at Dingwalls released as a live album two years later and a 1985 televised concert at the Camden Palace posthumously released on DVD and CD.

Cover versions 
In the years since, "30 Days" has been recorded by several artists, most notably Gov't Mule, Mr. Big, Ace Frehley, The Black Crowes, Kick Axe, and The Dead Daisies, and is a live staple of Canadian rock band The Trews.

In other media 
The song was featured on the Xbox One, PlayStation 4 and PC versions of Grand Theft Auto V, on the in-game radio station Los Santos Rock Radio. It was also the intro music to the "Tin Can Rehab" edition of Doug Stanhope's podcast.

Personnel

Humble Pie 
 Steve Marriott - vocals, guitar, harmonica, electric piano
 Clem Clempson - guitar, backing vocals
 Greg Ridley - bass, backing vocals
 Jerry Shirley - drums

References

External links
Humble Pie.net
Song facts  

1972 singles
Humble Pie (band) songs
Songs written by Steve Marriott
Songs about cannabis
Songs about drugs
Songs about heroin
1972 songs
A&M Records singles